K B High School is a high school in Mymensingh, Bangladesh.

Overview 

The school was established in 1971 to provide education for the children of the teachers and staff of Bangladesh Agricultural University. Later on the school expanded and over 2,000 students attended the school including the surrounding areas. From the beginning it made a very good success in the Board examination Secondary School Certificate in both science and arts. The main building consists three floors and there are three other structures which provide class rooms. 

It is one of the best schools in the district of Mymensingh and several times listed in the top 20 schools of Dhaka Board in S.S.C examination.

References 

Educational institutions established in 1971
High schools in Bangladesh
1971 establishments in Bangladesh